A.C. Libertas is a Sanmarinese football club, based in Borgo Maggiore. The club was founded in 1928. Libertas currently plays in Girone B of Campionato Sammarinese di Calcio. The team's colors are red and white.
Libertas is the oldest football club in San Marino.
The team qualified for the UEFA Cup Preliminary phase in 2007. However, they lost by a 1–4 aggregate to Drogheda United from Ireland in the next round.

Honours
Campionato Sammarinese di Calcio: 1
 1995–96

Coppa Titano:  11
 1937, 1950, 1954, 1958, 1959, 1961, 1987, 1989, 1991, 2006, 2014

San Marino Federal Trophy: 4
 1989, 1992, 1996, 2014

Current squad
As of 1 May 2021.

European record

External links
AC LIBERTAS site 
FSGC page
eufo.de – Team Squad

 
Association football clubs established in 1928
Football clubs in San Marino
Former Italian football clubs
1928 establishments in San Marino